The Massachusetts is a historic apartment building located at Indianapolis, Indiana.  It was built in 1905, and is a three-story, yellow brick and limestone building.  The first floor has commercial storefronts and the two upper stories have four plain Tuscan order pilasters.

It was listed on the National Register of Historic Places in 1983.  It is located in the Massachusetts Avenue Commercial District.

References

Apartment buildings in Indiana
Individually listed contributing properties to historic districts on the National Register in Indiana
Residential buildings on the National Register of Historic Places in Indiana
Residential buildings completed in 1905
Residential buildings in Indianapolis
National Register of Historic Places in Indianapolis
1905 establishments in Indiana